Ballinamallard or Bellanamallard is a small village and townland in County Fermanagh, Northern Ireland. It had a population of 1,340 people in the 2001 Census. It lies to the north of Enniskillen and is within Fermanagh and Omagh district.

The village has won several "best kept village" titles, and has a fountain to mark the honour. There has been only one local primary school: Ballinamallard Controlled Primary School, since the other, Shanmullagh Primary School, closed in August 2008.

As of 2016 NISRA estimate that 2,754 people live in the Ballinamallard Electoral Ward

History 
About 450AD Magheracross Parish is said to have been founded by St Patrick and about 550  St Columba passed thorough Ballinamallard. The first records of the parish itself were in 1492 with Terence Macgillacossgli (Cosgrave) is recorded as vicar of Magheracross and Derrybrusk,  Maghercross was at that time part of Derryvullen parish.

In 1500 two Maguire princes were ambushed by the O'Neills at Ballinamallard in their conflict and in  1539 the  Original Magheracross church destroyed by fire

1593 saw the start of Hugh O'Neill's war that resulted in the Flight of the Earls in 1611. Following which Henry Folliot of Pyrton in Wiltshire, was granted the manor of Drumchine (later Newporton) including 1,500 Irish acres through Magheracross parish. He built Castle Murray and imported tenants from the Scottish Borders between Dumfries and Carlisle who were fleeing the union of England and Scotland and the consequent pacification of the previously lawless area around Anglo-Scottish border under James I that was taking place at that time.

By 1622 there were 20 houses in Ballinamallard and the Church "standing but not
repaired within". In 1629 the old graveyard at Kilskeery and Magheracross was officially united with Kilskeery parish.

Religion was important through the 18th century. In 1704, Rev N Browne, Rector of Kilskeery, translated the Prayer Book into Irish. In 1766 Magheracross Parish split from Kilskeery and in 1769 John Wesley visited the area bringing Methodism.  Coa Chapel was built in 1770.  Ballinamallard Church of Ireland was built in 1785 and the Methodist Hall was constructed in 1800. The Present Church of Ireland was built in 1844.

The 18th century also saw non-religious developments, Magheracross House was built in 1740 and the Ballinamallard bridge was built in 1750. 1783 saw the Repeal of Poyning's Law and the Birth of Orange Peggy.

In the early 20th century, thousands of Cooneyites or "Dippers", followers of Edward Cooney and William Irvine, flocked to religious conventions at Crocknacrieve House near Ballinamallard. Converts were baptised by immersing them in Lough Erne or tributary rivers, events which attracted large crowds and international attention.

On the 16 October 1943 a Royal Air Force, Consolidated PBY Catalina (AH551) flying boat had departed RAF Killadeas on a training. The aircraft crashed into a hillside near Ballinamallard after the crew failed to recover from a practice stall. Eight of the Ten crew died in the crash.

Economy 
Many family businesses are located in Ballinamallard. In the 1970s the Development Association initiated some useful projects. The former Great Northern Railway station was converted to become Rascal's PlayStation, a purpose-built child care centre; the Commons was transformed to a children's playground, and industrial units were established on Enniskillen Road.

In 2007, Severfield purchased the Fisher family's Fisher Engineering for £88 million. The structural steelwork contractor was founded by the late Thomas Fisher when he returned from World War II, originally as an agricultural engineer, and went on to provide structural steelwork for the Belfast Waterfront Hall and Dublin Convention Centre. Now known as Severfield (NI) Ltd, it continues to be a major employer in the area.

Transport 
Ballinamallard railway station opened on 19 August 1854, but was finally closed on 1 October 1957.

Sport 
 The village is the home of Ballinamallard United, which plays in the IFA Premiership and Fermanagh Mallards F.C. Roy Carroll, a former Manchester United goalkeeper, used to play for Ballinamallard United.
 The area is particularly noted for its trout fishing, with Erne tributaries flowing through and around the village.
 Birthplace of Circuit of Ireland Rally driver Bertie Fisher

People 
 Douglas James Smyth Crozier – former Director of Education of Hong Kong
 Sir Edward Poynter married, Agnes, another of the MacDonald sisters so he also had roots in the village.
 Michael Jackson, the current Church of Ireland Archbishop of Dublin and Glendalough, lived in Ballinamallard in his youth. Archbishop Jackson previously served as Church of Ireland Lord Bishop of Clogher.

2001 Census 
Ballinamallard is classified as a village by the NI Statistics and Research Agency (NISRA) (i.e. with a population between 1,000 people and 2,250 people). On Census day (29 April 2001) there were 1,340 people living in Ballinamallard. Of these:
 24.9% were aged under 16 and 14.9% were aged 60 and over
 49.3% of the population were male and 50.7% were female
 3.4% were from a Catholic background and 95.6% were from a Protestant background
 3.2% of people aged 16–74 were unemployed.

For more details see: NI Neighbourhood Information Service

2011 Census 
On Census Day 27 March 2011, in Ballinamallard Ward, considering the resident population:

99.27% were from the white (including Irish Traveller) ethnic group;
21.69% belong to or were brought up in the Catholic religion and 75.17% belong to or were brought up in a 'Protestant and Other Christian (including Christian related)' religion; and
66.13% indicated that they had a British national identity, 14.11% had an Irish national identity and 29.16% had a Northern Irish national identity*.

Respondents could indicate more than one national identity

On Census Day 27 March 2011, in Ballinamallard Ward, considering the population aged 3 years old and over:

5.21% had some knowledge of Irish;
5.97% had some knowledge of Ulster-Scots; and
1.37% did not have English as their first language.

References 

Villages in County Fermanagh
Aviation accidents and incidents locations in Northern Ireland